White Rose is an unincorporated community in Greene County, Indiana, in the United States.

History
White Rose took its name from the White Rose coal mine.

References

Unincorporated communities in Greene County, Indiana
Unincorporated communities in Indiana